Geastrum campestre is an inedible species of mushroom belonging to the genus Geastrum, or earthstar fungi.

External links
Index Fungorum

campestre
Fungi of Europe
Inedible fungi
Fungi described in 1887